Shoes is a 1916 silent film drama directed by Lois Weber and starring Mary MacLaren. It was distributed by the Universal Film Manufacturing Company and produced by Bluebird Photoplays, a subsidiary of Universal based in New York City and with access to Universal's studio facilities in Fort Lee, New Jersey as well as in California. Shoes was added to the National Film Registry in 2014.

The film was held and restored by the EYE Film Institute Netherlands between 2008 and 2011. It is available on DVD and Blu-ray with a score composed by Donald Sosin and Mimi Rabson and audio commentary by film historian Shelley Stamp.

Plot

Eva Mayer (Mary MacLaren) works in a five-and-dime store for five dollars a week. That meager salary must solely support her family of two parents and three sisters because her father (Harry Griffith) prefers to lie in bed reading, smoking his pipe, and drinking pails of beer rather than looking for work. Eva desperately needs new shoes. The only pair she has are literally falling to pieces with soles that have large holes, so large in fact that she must insert pieces of cardboard inside her shoes to protect her feet. Finally, Eva decides to sleep with Charlie (William V. Mong), a local cabaret singer, in exchange for money. She buys new shoes but learns the same day that her father has finally secured a job, at least temporary work.

Cast

 Mary MacLaren – Eva Mayer
 Harry Griffith – Eva's father
 Mattie Witting – Eva's mother (credited as Mrs. A. E. Witting)
 Jessie Arnold – Lil, co-worker at store 
 William V. Mong – "Cabaret" Charlie
 Lina Basquette – Eva's sister (uncredited)

Production
In addition to directing the film, Lois Weber composed the production's scenario, adapting it from a short story written by American author and suffragist Stella Wynne Herron. That story, also titled  "Shoes", was originally published—complete with illustrations by Hal J. Mowat—in the January 1, 1916, issue of Collier's magazine. Herron, in turn, was inspired to write her dramatic tale about a poor young woman desperately needing shoes by Jane Addams' 1912 nonfiction book on prostitution, A New Conscience and an Ancient Evil. In fact, for the epigraph of her short story, Herron quotes directly from Addams' work: "When the shoes became too worn to endure a third soling and she possessed but 90 cents toward a new pair, she gave up the struggle; to use her own contemptuous phrase, she 'sold out for a new pair of shoes.

Weber in her screen adaptation followed closely Herron's narrative, with "dialogue from the story occasionally appearing verbatim in the film's intertitles." Weber did, though, make some obvious as well as subtle changes to lengthen the short story to a one-hour film. The director, largely in keeping with Herron's original story, also introduces the central character in her film as "Eva Mayer" and to her family as "the Mayers". Yet, references to the characters in 1916 publications and in modern film references often cite Eva's surname as "Meyer".

Casting the film's lead

According to news items in 1916 film publications, while Lois Weber was still working on the scenario for Shoes, she met 16-year-old Mary MacDonald in the early weeks of 1916, when the young chorus girl was with a group of other women looking for work as extras at Universal Studios in California. Weber was reportedly "impressed by her style and peculiar type of beauty", so much so that the director gave Mary uncredited bit parts in two productions: John Needham's Double, which was released in April 1916, and Where Are My Children?, released in May. Weber also kept her in mind as a possible choice for the role of Eva in Shoes. A few weeks later, after Weber finally decided to cast the inexperienced screen performer for the starring role in Shoes, the director assigned MacDonald a new surname for promoting and crediting her work: MacLaren (spelled McLaren in the film's opening title card). Many studio observers in the media in 1916 expressed amazement regarding the actress's meteoric rise to stardom. The Baltimore Sun newspaper attributed her "sudden fame" to the "whims of fortune". Commenting too about such good fortune, the New York-based trade journal The Moving Picture World stated, "Mary MacLaren is a mighty lucky young lady to have Lois Weber sponsoring her future upon the screen...she is a full-fledged star in about the fastest time known to screen history."

Set composition
Weber in filming Shoes utilized fully furnished interior sets at the studio rather than partially constructed "corner sets". As was customary in her productions, Weber created authentic-looking settings for a dual purpose: to enhance the story's appearance on screen and to enhance the performances of her cast by immersing the actors in environments with "physical and psychological realism". The trade journal The Moving Picture Weekly was one of the publications in 1916 that described the principal sets used on Shoes:

Release and reception
Released on June 26, 1916, the film became Universal's most-booked Bluebird production by regional distributors and theaters. It also received that year widespread public acclaim, including positive reviews from critics in trade publications and in many newspapers across the country. Prior to the film's release, the New York-based trade journal Motion Picture News reported comments expressed by H. M. Hoffman, the general manager of Bluebird Photoplays, who predicted great success for his studio's new motion picture. "I am willing", he stated, "to stake "Bluebird's reputation and my own, upon the outcome of this release." Hoffman further predicted, "It will be the most discussed and most profitable feature ever released during a program series."

Reviews in 1916 appear to justify the Bluebird manager's confident expectations. In its July 3 edition that year, the San Francisco Chronicle describes the drama as "absorbing" and its cast "capable" and "well-balanced". The newspaper underscores too the cultural significance of the film, calling it "one of the most important sociological plays presented on the screen." Grace Kingsley, reviewing the film on behalf of the Los Angeles Times, heaped even greater praise on the release:

In Illinois, Louella Parsons, the film critic for The Chicago Herald, ranked Shoes as "one of the best moving pictures of 1916", a story that "loosens the heartstrings, stirs the pulse and makes one choke with emotion." The co-editor of the widely read entertainment paperVariety had a more measured response to the drama. Writing under the pen name "Jolo", Joshua Lowe characterized the tragic story as "devoid of all theatricalism" and "far above the average of Bluebird releases." Lowe noted in particular that Mary MacLaren "gave an exceptionally good portrayal of the hopeless creature."

Beyond recognizing and describing the broader cultural significance of the film, some newspapers in 1916 urged their readers, especially parents, to see the photoplay for simply the benefit of their own households. The Chicago Defender, one of the leading African-American newspapers in the United States, was among those periodicals promoting that benefit: "There is a lesson in this feature for every father and mother who have made themselves responsible for the welfare of a daughter—it expounds the greatest problem ever essayed in moving pictures and does it deftly, clearly and with gripping interest."

Praise for the film, however, was not universal in the media in 1916. Peter Milne, the reviewer for Motion Picture News, insisted that Weber had exceeded acceptable limits for realism in depicting Eva's "trials and hardships".  "Miss Weber", he observes in his June 24 assessment of the film, "has gone a step too far in showing a closeup of the girl extracting splinters from the sole of her foot", as well as "showing the girl scraping mud from her feet with a pair of scissors." Milne then adds, "There is such a thing as being too realistic." Julian Johnson, writing for the leading movie-fan magazine Photoplay, summarized Weber's "remarkable play" as being "big in thought and treatment—marred by melodramatic crudities."

Parody of Shoes, 1932
In 1932—sixteen years after the release of Shoes—Universal Studios produced a parody of Weber's film, converting it to a sound comedy short by re-editing original footage from the 1916 drama and using voiceovers by a "great wisecracker" to amuse theater audiences.  The sound "novelty", titled The Unshod Maiden, was directed by Albert DeMond, who also wrote the satirical narration for the 10-minute film. In its positive review of the short in March 1932, The Film Daily alludes to neither Weber nor Shoes, but the trade paper's synopsis of the comedy's plot clearly shows that it mirrors the storyline of the 1916 feature:
In the weeks prior to the official release of The Unshod Maiden, screenings of the comedy were presented by Universal at private gatherings and in select theaters. Motion Picture Herald, another popular film-industry publication in 1932, reports on DeMond's parody in its February 20 issue and refers directly to the original footage and to the star of Shoes but mentions nothing about Weber:

References

Further reading
 Addams, Jane. A new conscience and an ancient evil. University of Illinois Press, 2002.
 "Bluebird Photo Plays". The Saturday Evening Post. 188: 28. 1916 – via Google Books.
 Milestone Film & Video. "Amy Heller on Lois Weber's Cinematic Masterpiece, Shoes (1916)." Vimeo.com, 26 Jan. 2018.
 The Milestone Cinematheque. "SHOES Press Kit." The Films of Lois Weber.
 "SHOES." The Films of Lois Weber.
 "SHOES." The Moving Picture Weekly, 1917, pp. 169–170,-192.
 Stamp, Shelley. "National Film Registry Essay." Library of Congress.

External links
 
 
 
 
 Shoes restoration clip from EYE

1916 films
American silent feature films
Films based on short fiction
Films directed by Lois Weber
1916 drama films
American black-and-white films
Silent American drama films
Universal Pictures films
United States National Film Registry films
American feminist films
1910s American films